Lucky Street may refer to:

Places
Lucky Street, Beijing
Lucky Street Gallery, Key West, Florida, exhibiting artists such as Phyllis Rose and Kue King

Music
Lucky Street (album) by Go Radio 2011